The Queensland Railways Double Boilered Cross Locomotives class locomotive was a locomotive class of 0-6-0+0-6-0 steam locomotives built for, but never operated by, the Queensland Railways.

History
In 1867, James Cross and Company of St Helens, England, delivered three  0-6-0+0-6-0 double boilered locomotives as knocked down kits to the Queensland Railways' North Ipswich Railway Workshops.

One was assembled coming in six tons overweight. After operating two trials on the line to Toowoomba, where it spread the rails and ultimately derailed, Queensland Railways refused to accept them. Two were sold to the Central Argentine Railway for use at Montevideo, while the third was sold to the Burry Port and Gwendraeth Valley Railway, Wales and named Victoria.

References

Railway locomotives introduced in 1867
Double
0-6-0+0-6-0 locomotives
3 ft 6 in gauge locomotives of Australia
Fairlie locomotives